Histopathology is a monthly peer-reviewed medical journal covering diagnostic, research, and surgical pathology. It was established in 1977 and is published by Wiley-Blackwell. The editor-in-chief is Daniel Berney.

Publications established in 1977
Wiley-Blackwell academic journals
Quarterly journals
Pathology journals
English-language journals
Histopathology